Willy Skibby (born 20 February 1942) is a Danish former cyclist. Skibby was born in Copenhagen and his profession was a car mechanic. His sporting career began with D:C:R: Copenhagen. He competed in the individual road race event at the 1976 Summer Olympics.

References

External links
 

1942 births
Living people
Danish male cyclists
Olympic cyclists of Denmark
Cyclists at the 1976 Summer Olympics
People from Skanderborg Municipality
Sportspeople from the Central Denmark Region